Thomas Menees (June 26, 1823 – September 6, 1905) was a Confederate politician who represented Tennessee in the Confederate States Congress during much of the American Civil War. He was trained as physician, and between 1874 and 1895 served as the dean of the merged medical departments of the University of Nashville and Vanderbilt University.

Early life
Menees was born on June 26, 1823 in Davidson County, Tennessee. He earned his M.D. degree from Transylvania University in 1846.

Career
Menees began his career as a physician in Springfield, Tennessee.

Menees was elected as a Democratic member of the Tennessee State Senate in 1857. During the American Civil War, he represented Tennessee in the First Confederate Congress and the Second Confederate Congress from 1862 to 1865.

After the war, Menees became a physician in Nashville. He was a professor of Obstretics at the University of Nashville and Vanderbilt University. In 1874, the medical departments of both universities were merged and Menees became their dean. He held this position until 1895.

Death
Menees died on September 6, 1905 in Nashville, Tennessee. He was buried in Mount Olivet Cemetery.

References

1823 births
1905 deaths
People from Davidson County, Tennessee
Democratic Party Tennessee state senators
Members of the Confederate House of Representatives from Tennessee
Vanderbilt University faculty
American obstetricians
19th-century American politicians
19th-century American physicians
Physicians from Tennessee
19th-century American businesspeople